Several ships have been named Earl of Lonsdale for the Earl of Lonsdale:

  was launched at Whitehaven. She sailed as West Indiaman. She next made one voyage to the East Indies in 1814, and then returned to the West Indies trade. A gale at Jamaica in October 1815 destroyed her.
, of 310 tons burthen, was launched at Whitehaven; she was last listed in 1860
 was an iron, screw steamer of 1542 grt, launched at Shields, that wrecked in 1885.

Ship names